Burning Man is an event focused on community, art, self-expression, and self-reliance held annually in the western United States. The name of the event comes from its culminating ceremony: the symbolic burning of a large wooden effigy, referred to as the Man, that occurs on the penultimate night of Burning Man, which is the Saturday evening before Labor Day. As outlined by Burning Man co-founder Larry Harvey in 2004, the event is guided by ten principles: radical inclusion, gifting, decommodification, radical self-reliance, radical self-expression, communal effort, civic responsibility, leaving no trace, participation, and immediacy.

The event originated on June 22, 1986, on Baker Beach in San Francisco as a small function organized by Larry Harvey and Jerry James, the builders of the first Man. It has since been held annually, spanning the nine days leading up to and including Labor Day. Over the event's history, attendance has generally increased. In 2019, 78,850 people participated in the event. In 2021, the unofficial event had an estimated 20,000 attendees.

NPR said about Burning Man, "Once considered an underground gathering for bohemians and free spirits of all stripes, Burning Man has since evolved into a destination for social media influencers, celebrities and the Silicon Valley elite." At Burning Man, the participants design and build all the art, activities, and events. Artwork at Burning Man includes experimental and interactive sculptures, buildings, performances and art cars, among other media. These contributions are inspired by a theme that is chosen annually by the Burning Man Project. An anonymous attendee once elaborated that "Burning Man is about 'why not' overwhelming 'why. Participation is a key precept for the community, so there is much controversy in the community over the problem of non-participatory influencers and elite at the event.

Burning Man is organized by the Burning Man Project, a non-profit organization that, in 2013, succeeded Black Rock City LLC, a for-profit limited liability company. Black Rock City LLC was formed in 1999 to represent the event's organizers and is now considered a subsidiary of the non-profit organization. The Burning Man Project endorses multiple smaller regional events guided by the Burning Man principles, both in the United States and internationally. The organization provides the essential infrastructure of Black Rock City and works year-round to bring Burning Man culture to the world through programs such as Burners Without Borders, Black Rock Solar, and Global Arts Grants.

History

1980s

Burning Man began as a bonfire ritual on the summer solstice. Sculptor Mary Grauberger, a friend of Larry Harvey's girlfriend, Janet Lohr, held solstice bonfire gatherings on Baker Beach for several years prior to 1986, some of which Harvey attended. When Grauberger stopped organizing it, Harvey "picked up the torch", with Grauberger's permission, and ran with it. He and Jerry James built the first wooden effigy on the afternoon of June 21, 1986, cobbled together using scrap wood, to be torched later that evening. Harvey later described his inspiration for burning these effigies as a spontaneous act of "radical self-expression".

By 1988, Larry Harvey formally named the summer solstice ritual "Burning Man", by titling flyers for the happening as such; to ward off references such as "wicker man", referring to the practice of burning live sacrifices in wicker cages. Harvey has stated that he had not seen the 1973 cult film The Wicker Man until many years after and that it did not inspire the action.

1990 to 1996

In 1990, a separate event was planned by Kevin Evans and John Law on the remote and largely unknown dry lake or playa known as Black Rock Desert, about 110 miles north of Reno, Nevada. Evans conceived it as a dadaist temporary autonomous zone with sculpture to be burned and situationist performance art. He asked John Law, who also had experience on the dry lake and was a defining founder of Cacophony Society, to take on central organizing functions. In the Cacophony Society's newsletter, it was announced as Zone Trip No. 4, A Bad Day at Black Rock (inspired by the 1955 film of the same name).

Meanwhile, the beach burn was interrupted by the park police for not having a permit. After striking a deal to raise the Man but not to burn it, event organizers disassembled the Man and returned it to the vacant lot where it had been built. Shortly thereafter, the legs and torso of the Man were chain-sawed and the pieces removed when the lot was unexpectedly leased as a parking lot. The Man was reconstructed, led by Dan Miller, Harvey's then-housemate of many years, just in time to take it to Zone Trip No. 4.

Michael Mikel, another active Cacophonist, realized that participants unfamiliar with the environment of the dry lake would be helped by knowledgeable persons to ensure they did not get lost in the deep dry lake and risk dehydration and death. He took the name Danger Ranger and created the Black Rock Rangers. Thus Black Rock City began as a fellowship, organized by Law and Mikel, based on Evans' and Grauberger's ideas, along with Harvey and James' symbolic man. Drawing on experience in the sign business and with light sculpture, John Law prepared custom neon tubes for the Man starting in 1991 so it could be seen as a beacon to aid navigation at night long before there were any planned roads.

In its early years, the community grew by word of mouth alone, all were considered (and generally not invited until they could be expected to be) participants under their contribution to the cacophonous situationist vibe. There were no paid or scheduled performers or artists, no separation between art and life nor art-space and living-space, no rules other than "Don't interfere with anyone else's immediate experience" and "no guns in central camp".

1991 marked the first year that the event had a legal permit, through the BLM (the Bureau of Land Management). 1991 was also the year that art model and fire dancer (and later Burning Man's first art director) Crimson Rose attended the event. 1992 saw the birth of a smaller, intensive (about 20 participants the first year; about 100 in years two and three) near-by event named "Desert Siteworks", conceived and directed by William Binzen and co-produced (in 1993 and '94) with Judy West. The annual, several weeks-long event, was held over summer Solstice at various fertile hot springs surrounding the desert. Participants built art and participated in self-directed performances. Some key organizers of Burning Man were also part of Desert Siteworks (John Law, Michael Mikel) and William Binzen was a friend of Larry Harvey. Hence, the two events saw much cross-pollination of ideas and participants. The Desert Siteworks project ran for three years (1992–1994). 1996 was the first year a formal partnership was created to own the name "Burning Man" and was also the last year that the event was held in the middle of the Black Rock Desert with no fence around it.

Before the event opened to the public in 1996, a worker named Michael Furey was killed in a motorcycle crash while riding from Gerlach, Nevada, to the Burning Man camp in the Black Rock Desert. Harvey insisted that the death had not occurred at Burning Man, since the gates were not yet open. Another couple were run over in their tent by an art car driving to "rave camp", which was at that time distant from the main camp. After the 1996 event, co-founder and partner John Law broke with Burning Man and publicly said the event should not continue.

1997 to 2013

1997 marked another major pivotal year for the event. The location had to be moved because the permit for Black Rock was denied for the 1997 event. A team conducting land speed trials had a conflicting permit that took precedence. Fly Ranch, with the smaller adjoining Hualapai dry lake-bed, just west of the Black Rock desert, was chosen as the alternate location. This moved Burning Man from Pershing County/federal BLM land into the jurisdiction of Washoe County, which brought a protracted list of permit requirements.

To comply with the new requirements and to manage the increased liability load, the organizers formed Black Rock City LLC, with the assistance of "Biz Babe" Dana Harrison. Will Roger Peterson and Flynn Mauthe created the Department of Public Works (DPW) to build the "city" grid layout (a requirement so that emergency vehicles could be directed to an "address") designed by Rod Garrett, an architect. Rod continued as the city designer until his death, in 2011, at the age of 76. He is also credited with the design of all of the Man bases from 2001 through 2012, the center camp café and first camp. 1998 saw a return to the Black Rock desert, although not to the deep playa, along with a temporary perimeter fence. The event has remained there since.

As the population of Black Rock City grew, and more restrictions were added by the BLM, and changes were made in how people were invited to the event (notably the addition of publicized online ticket sales to all comers), further rules were established concerning its survival. Some critics of the later phase of the event cite the imposition of these rules as impinging on the original freedoms and principles, diminishing the scope of the experience unacceptably, while many newer attendees find the increased level of activity more than balances out the changes.
 A grid street structure.
 A ban on driving, except for approved "mutant vehicles" and service vehicles.
 Safety standards on mutant vehicles.
 Burning of any art must be done on an approved burn platform.
 A ban on fireworks.
 A ban on animals.

Another notable restriction to attendees is the 9.2-mile- (14.8 km) long temporary plastic fence that surrounds the event and defines the pentagon of land used by the event on the southern edge of the Black Rock dry lake. This 4-foot- (1.2-meter) high barrier is known as the "trash fence" because its initial use was to catch wind-blown debris that might escape from campsites during the event. Since 2002, the area beyond this fence has not been accessible to Burning Man participants during the week of the event.

One visitor who was accidentally burned at the 2005 event unsuccessfully sued Black Rock City LLC in San Francisco County Superior Court. On June 30, 2009, the California Courts of Appeal for the First District upheld the trial court's grant of summary judgment to Black Rock City LLC on the basis that people who deliberately walk towards The Man after it is ignited assume the risk of getting burned by such a hazardous object.

2013 to 2019

In December 2013, Black Rock City LLC was made a subsidiary of a new non-profit entity known as the Burning Man Project, though this was a controversial move among the founders.

On September 3, 2017, a 41-year-old man, Aaron Joel Mitchell, fought his way past a safety cordon of volunteers and firefighters and threw himself into the flames of the Man. Mitchell died the next day due to cardiac arrest, bodily shock, and third-degree burns to 98% of his body. While a reputable member of the DPW claims this was the result of a dare to run through the flames, his death was ruled a suicide.

2020 to 2021

On April 10, 2020, the Burning Man Project announced that Burning Man was canceled for 2020 due to the COVID-19 pandemic, making 2020 the first year Burning Man would not happen since its inception. They then decided to offer ticket refunds despite the tickets being sold explicitly as non-refundable.

On September 7, 2020, an estimated 1,000 Burners celebrated on San Francisco's Ocean Beach. San Francisco Mayor London Breed tweeted about the event, "This was reckless and selfish. You aren't celebrating, but are putting people's lives and our progress at risk. No one is immune from spreading the virus." Several thousand also showed up in the Black Rock desert for an unofficial event and some described it as a return to the "old days".

The 2021 event was canceled on April 27, 2021, due to the continuation of the COVID-19 pandemic. Despite progress on vaccination, organizers stated that "uncertainties that need to be resolved are impossible to resolve in the time we have". On May 14, 2021, the Burning Man Project released tickets on their website for online events slated between August 22 and September 7, 2021.

The unofficial event was larger than 2020 with an estimated 20,000 attending. It was loosely coordinated by a variety of groups including Black Rock Plan B and Rogue Burn. The Bureau of Land Management implemented restrictions including no structures other than shade structures and no fires other than campfires. There was a massive illuminated drone display outlining the Man instead of the burning of a Man effigy.

Event timeline
The statistics below illustrate the growth in both the scale and scope of Burning Man in terms of location, height of the central Man sculpture, population, ticket price, and several registered camps and art.

During those years, changes in the size and form of the base on which the wooden Man stood accounted for the differing heights of the overall structures.

Population counts 
The population count is a stipulation of the Special Recreation Permit (SRP) granted to the Burning Man Project, formerly Black Rock City, LLC (BRC), by the BLM, for the event each year. Originally used to calculate fees, it's now used to ensure that the event does not exceed the maximum authorized population as specified in the SRP. Not everyone at the event is included in the population count. Exempted from the count are government personnel and government contractors; however, this has changed over time.

The population count was originally used to calculate fees owed to the BLM. It was not long until the BLM began considering putting a limit on the number of people that would be allowed to attend the event. This became a point of contention as early as 1998 when the BLM proposed a complicated usage formula, effectively limiting the size of the event to that of the previous year.

Starting in 2006, the SRP stipulated that BRC manage "ticket sales in a manner to keep the maximum population of the event from increasing more than 6% above the highest population recorded in a previous year." Fees were based on the daily population counts of Black Rock City at noon. This was the first year where fees were explicitly exempted for BRC staff..

In 2011, the fee structure changed to be based on adjusted gross income and was no longer tied to daily population counts.

The 2012 SRP further defined who was to be counted in population counts. The term "participant" was introduced, as defined in that year's Environmental Assessment (EA), to include "all attendees of the event, including paid participants and volunteers. The population does not include government personnel, Humboldt General Hospital emergency service providers, vendors and contractors." The maximum authorized population now applied to "participants".

In 2014, volunteers were explicitly exempted from the population count and the population cap was further refined to now apply to "paid participants".

In 2019, the definition of "population" changed again, this time to include BRC staff and volunteers, now collectively referred to as "attendees". This coincided with the necessity of a new Environmental Impact Statement (EIS) for the 2019-2028 SRP application which introduced this change in definition.
The Burning Man Project reported a population of 78,850 for that year, an increase of about 8,600 people from the previous year, noting that "everyone" was now being counted in the maximum population count. This roughly correlates with the Burning Man Project's 2019 Form 990 disclosure which states it employs 986 people and has 10,000 volunteers.

In 2022, an additional restriction on the total number of attendees for the entirety of the event was introduced. "The cumulative maximum authorized population for the 2022 event is 87,000 total attendees." The maximum number of attendees on the playa at any one time remained as it was in 2019 at 80,000.

Principles 

Because of the variety of goals fostered by participatory attendees, known as "Burners," Burning Man does not have a single focus. Features of the event are subject to the participants and include community, artwork, absurdity, decommodification and revelry. Participation is encouraged.

The Burning Man event and its affiliated communities are guided by 10 principles that are meant to evoke the cultural ethos that has emerged from the event. They were originally written by Larry Harvey in 2004 as guidelines for regional organizing, then later became a universal criterion of the general culture of the multifaceted movement. The 10 Principles are:
 radical inclusion
 gifting
 decommodification
 radical self-reliance
 radical self-expression
 communal effort
 civic responsibility
 leaving no trace
 participation
 immediacy
The descriptions in quotes are the actual text:

Radical inclusion
"Anyone may be a part of Burning Man. We welcome and respect the stranger. No prerequisites exist for participation in our community."
This was written with a broad stroke for general organizing, meaning anyone is welcome to the Burning Man culture. Prerequisites for the Burning Man event are: participants are expected to provide for their own basic needs, follow the guidelines stated in the annually updated event "survival guide", and purchase a $475 ticket to get in.

Gifting
"Burning Man is devoted to acts of gift-giving. The value of a gift is unconditional. Gifting does not contemplate a return or an exchange for something of equal value."
Instead of cash, participants at the Burning Man event in the Black Rock Desert are encouraged to rely on a gift economy, a sort of potlatch. In the earliest days of the event, an underground barter economy also existed, in which burners exchanged "favours" with each other. While this was originally supported by the Burning Man organization, this is now largely discouraged. Instead, burners are encouraged to give gifts to one another unconditionally.

Decommodification
"To preserve the spirit of gifting, our community seeks to create social environments that are unmediated by commercial sponsorships, transactions, or advertising. We stand ready to protect our culture from such exploitation. We resist the substitution of consumption for participatory experience."
No cash transactions are permitted between attendees of the Burning Man event in the Black Rock Desert. Cash can be used for a select few charity, fuel, and sanitation vendors as follows:
 Café beverages such as coffee, chai, lemonade, etc., which are sold at Center Camp Café, operated by the organizers of the event. Citing cost, decreased need, environmental impact, and decommodification, beverage sales were halted in 2022.
 Ice sales benefit the local Gerlach-Empire school system.
 Tickets for the shuttle bus to the nearest Nevada communities of Gerlach and Empire which is operated by a contractor not participating in the event: Green Tortoise.
 A re-entry wristband, which allows a person to leave and re-enter the event and may be purchased at the gate upon exit.
 An airport use fee, payable at the airport upon first entry.
 Diesel and biodiesel sold by third-party contractors.
 RV dump service and camp graywater disposal service.
 Private portable toilets and servicing, which can be arranged with the official contractor.

Radical self-reliance

"Burning Man encourages the individual to discover, exercise, and rely on his or her inner resources."
The event's harsh environment and remote location require participants to be responsible for their subsistence. Since the LLC forbids most commerce, participants must be prepared and bring all their own supplies with the exception of the items stated in Decommodification. Public portable toilets are also available throughout the city; some of these are, like art cars, decorated in imaginative ways by volunteers.

Radical self-expression

"Radical self-expression arises from the unique gifts of the individual. No one other than the individual or a collaborating group can determine its content. It is offered as a gift to others. In this spirit, the giver should respect the rights and liberties of the recipient."
Participants at the Burning Man event in the Black Rock Desert are encouraged to express themselves in a number of ways through various art forms and projects. The event is clothing-optional and public nudity is common, though not practiced by the majority.

Communal effort
"Our community values creative cooperation and collaboration. We strive to produce, promote and protect social networks, public spaces, works of art, and methods of communication that support such interaction."
Participants at the Burning Man event in the Black Rock Desert are encouraged to work with and help fellow participants.

Civic responsibility
"We value civil society. Community members who organize events should assume responsibility for public welfare and endeavor to communicate civic responsibilities to participants. They must also assume responsibility for conducting events in accordance with local, state and federal laws."

Leave no trace

"Our community respects the environment. We are committed to leaving no physical trace of our activities wherever we gather. We clean up after ourselves and endeavor, whenever possible, to leave such places in a better state than when we found them."

Participation

"Our community is committed to a radically participatory ethic. We believe that transformative change, whether in the individual or in society, can occur only through the medium of deeply personal participation. We achieve being through doing. Everyone is invited to work. Everyone is invited to play. We make the world real through actions that open the heart." People are encouraged to participate, rather than observe.

Immediacy
"Immediate experience is, in many ways, the most important touchstone of value in our culture. We seek to overcome barriers that stand between us and a recognition of our inner selves, the reality of those around us, participation in society, and contact with a natural world exceeding human powers. No idea can substitute for this experience."

The Temple 

The Temple is the secondary major recurring art installation at Burning Man after the Man, and is considered just as important to the event culture. According to the Burning Man Project, "The Temple is a community shared space that is an important part of Black Rock City. It is not a temple in recognition of any religion; it's a neutral, non-denominational spiritual space where everyone can gather to share in the experience of remembering the past, honoring or cursing the present, and pondering the future to come."

The prime function of the Temple is to be a canvas upon which people can leave words and objects behind to be burned, and to serve as "a place of contemplation, a place to rest, a place of reflection, a place of rituals, weddings, reunions, etc". During the event, 400 volunteer Temple Guardians monitor the Temple 24 hours a day. The Temple is burned on the eighth and final night of the festival, following the "Man burn" on the previous night.

Timeline
Source:

Art

A hallmark of Burning Man is large-scale interactive installation art inspired by the intersection of maker culture, technology, and nature. Many works invite participation through climbing, touch, technological interfaces, or motion. At night much of the artwork is illuminated by fire or LEDs. Creative expression through art is encouraged at Burning Man in many forms. Music, performance art, and guerrilla theatre are art forms commonly presented within the camps and developed areas of the city. Artwork is placed in the open playa beyond the streets of the city. Each year hundreds of works of art, ranging from small to very large-scale, are brought to Black Rock City.

Art on the playa is assisted by a department of the Burning Man Project called the Artery, which helps artists place their art in the desert and ensures lighting (to prevent collisions), burn platform (to protect the integrity of the dry lake bed) and that fire safety requirements are met. Art grants are, however, available to participants via a system of curation and oversight, with application deadlines early in the year. Grants are intended to help artists produce work beyond the scope of their own means, and are generally intended to cover only a portion of the costs associated with creation of the pieces, usually requiring considerable reliance on an artist's community resources. Aggregate funding for all grants varies depending on the number and quality of the submissions (usually well over 100) but amounts to several percent (on the order of $500,000 in recent years) of the gross receipts from ticket sales. In 2006, 29 pieces were funded.

Various standards regarding the nature of the artworks eligible for grants are set by the Art Department, but compliance with the theme and interactivity are important considerations. This funding has fostered artistic communities, most notably in the Bay Area of California, the region that has historically provided a majority of the event's participants. There are active and successful outreach efforts to enlarge the regional scope of the event and the grant program.

No Spectators: The Art of Burning Man 
In 2018, the Renwick Gallery of the Smithsonian American Art Museum in Washington, D.C. brought art from Burning Man to the nation's capital. The exhibition took over the entire Renwick Gallery building and surrounding neighborhood. The exhibit featured room-sized installations, costumes, and jewelry, while photographs and archival materials from the Nevada Museum of Art trace Burning Man's growth and its bohemian roots.

Large-scale installations form the core of the exhibition. Individual artists and collectives featured in the exhibit include David Best, Candy Chang, Marco Cochrane, Duane Flatmo, Michael Garlington and Natalia Bertotti, Five Ton Crane Arts Collective, FoldHaus Art Collective, Scott Froschauer, HYBYCOZO, (Yelena Filipchuk and Serge Beaulieu), Android Jones, Aaron Taylor Kuffner, Christopher Schardt, Richard Wilks, and Leo Villareal.

In addition, multiple large-scale public Burning Man art installations were exhibited throughout the neighborhood surrounding the museum, for an extension of the show No Spectators: Beyond the Renwick, which included works by Jack Champion, Mr. and Mrs. Ferguson, HYBYCOZO, Laura Kimpton, Kate Raudenbush, and Mischell Riley. All outdoor works had been installed as honorarium artwork at Burning Man in years past, except for the artwork by Hybycozo. This outdoor exhibition was co-produced by a first ever collaboration with the Golden Triangle BID (Business Improvement District in Washington DC), curated by Karyn Miller.

Mutant vehicles

Mutant Vehicles are purpose-built or creatively altered motorized vehicles. The term "Mutant Vehicle" was coined by organizers of the Burning Man event to delineate a type of "Art Car" that was more dramatically modified than simply decorating an existing vehicle.

Burning Man participants who wish to bring motorized mutant vehicles must submit their designs in advance to the event's own DMV or "Department of Mutant Vehicles" for consideration. If a vehicle design meets the "Mutant Vehicle Criteria," the vehicle is invited to the event for a final physical inspection and licensing at the event. Not all designs and proposals are accepted. The event organizers, and in turn the DMV, have set the bar high for what it deems an acceptable MV each year, in effect capping the number of Mutant Vehicles. This is in response to constraints imposed by the U.S. Bureau of Land Management, which grants permits to hold the event on federal property, and to participants who want to maintain a pedestrian-friendly environment. Vehicles that are minimally altered, and/or whose primary function is to transport participants, are discouraged and not invited. One of the criteria the DMV employs to determine whether an application for a proposed Mutant Vehicle is approved is "can you recognize the base vehicle". For example, if a 1967 VW van covered with glitter, dolls' heads, and old cooking utensils can still be recognized as a VW van, the DMV would consider it an "Art Car," but it would not be sufficiently altered to meet the Mutant Vehicle Criteria.

There were over six hundred approved Mutant Vehicles at the event in 2010.

Bicycles

Bicycles and tricycles are popular for getting around on the dry lake. Mountain bikes are generally preferred over road bikes for riding on the dried silt, which is normally hard but becomes loose with traffic. Participants often decorate their bikes to make them unique. Since lighting on the bikes is critically important for safety at night, many participants incorporate the lighting into their decorations, using electroluminescent wire (a thin, flexible tube that glows with a neon-like effect when energized with electricity, also known as el wire) to create intricate patterns over the frame of the bike. Every night during Burning Man, thousands of people on their bikes and art cars, illuminated sculptures and stages create a unique visual effect.

Theme camps

Electronic music
Camps focusing on electronic music, often played by live DJs, began to appear in 1992, an influence of the rave culture of the San Francisco area. Terbo Ted was identified as having been the first ever DJ in Burning Man history, opening with a Jean Michel Jarre song played off a vinyl record. DJs typically occupied an area on the outskirts of the Playa nicknamed the "Techno Ghetto". In later years, certain spokes of the main camp were designated for "sound camps", with limits on volume and speaker positioning (angled away from the center of Black Rock City). To work around the rules, mutant vehicles with live DJs and large sound systems began to appear as well. A number of major electronic music camps have been well-known returnees at Burning Man, including Opulent Temple and Robot Heart. Major producers and DJs representing various eras and genres have performed at Burning Man, including Armin van Buuren, Carl Cox, Markus Schulz, Paul Oakenfold, François Kevorkian and Freq Nasty among others.

In recent years, concerns began to surface among attendees that a growing number of "mainstream" electronic dance music acts (such as Skrillex and Diplo's Jack Ü in 2014) had begun to appear. In 2015, organizers established a new area known as the "Deep Playa Music Zone" (or DMZ), to serve as a new host for sound trucks featuring live DJs.

Black Rock City

Black Rock City, often abbreviated to BRC, is the temporary city created by Burning Man participants. Much of the layout and general city infrastructure is constructed by Department of Public Works (DPW) volunteers who often reside in Black Rock City for several weeks before and after the event. The remainder of the city including theme camps, villages, art installations and individual camping are all created by participants.

City planning
The developed part of the city is currently arranged as a series of concentric streets in an arc composing, since 1999, two-thirds of a 1.5-mile (2.4-km) diameter circle with the Man at the very center. Radial streets, sometimes called Avenues, extend from the Man to the outermost circle. The outlines of these streets are visible on aerial photographs. The "missing" third of the circle, along with the open interior, is used to display art installations. The innermost street is named the Esplanade, and the remaining streets are given names to coincide with the overall theme of the burn, and ordered in ways such as alphabetical order or stem to stern, to make them easier to recall. For example, in 1999, for the "Wheel of Time" theme, and again in 2004 for "The Vault of Heaven" theme, the streets were named after the planets of the solar system. The radial streets are usually given a clock designation, for example, 6:00 or 6:15, in which the Man is at the center of the clock face and 12:00 is in the middle of the third of the arc lacking streets (usually at a bearing of 60° true from the Man). These avenues have been identified in other ways, notably in 2002, in accordance with "The Floating World" theme, as the degrees of a compass, for example 175 degrees, and in 2003 as part of the Beyond Belief theme as adjectives ("Rational, Absurd") that caused every intersection with a concentric street (named after concepts of belief such as "Authority, Creed") to form a phrase such as "Absurd Authority" or "Rational Creed." However, these proved unpopular with participants due to difficulty in navigating the city without the familiar clock layout.

The Black Rock City Airport is constructed adjacent to the city, typically on its southern side. See Transportation section below.

Center Camp

Center Camp is located along the midline of Black Rock City, facing the Man at the 6:00 position on the Esplanade. This area serves as a central meeting place for the entire city and contains the Center Camp Cafe, Camp Arctica, and a number of other city institutions.

Villages and theme camps
Villages and theme camps are located along the innermost streets of Black Rock City, often offering entertainment or services to participants.

Theme camps are usually a collective of people representing themselves under a single identity. Villages are usually a collection of smaller theme camps which have banded together in order to share resources and vie for better placement.

Theme camps and villages often form to create an atmosphere in Black Rock City that their group envisioned. As Burning Man grows every year it attracts an even more diverse crowd. Subcultures form around theme camps at Black Rock City similar to what can be found in other cities.

Volunteers
The Burning Man event is heavily dependent on a large number of volunteers.

Safety, policing and regulations
Black Rock City is patrolled by various local and state law enforcement agencies as well as the Bureau of Land Management Rangers. The local police issue $1,500 fines for drug use and serving alcohol to minors. Burning Man also has its own in-house group of volunteers, the Black Rock Rangers, who act as informal mediators when disputes arise between participants.

Firefighting, emergency medical services (EMS), mental health, and communications support is provided by the volunteer Black Rock City Emergency Services Department (ESD). Three "MASH"-like stations are set up in the city: station 3, 6,and 9. Station 6 is staffed by physicians and nurses working with a contracted state licensed ALS Medical provider, while Stations 3 and 9 are staffed by Black Rock City ESD personnel. While Station 3 and 9 provide emergency services and basic life support, the volunteers are generally doctors, nurses, EMTs/paramedics, and firefighters. Both station 3 and 9 have a small fire engines available in addition to a Hazardous material/Rescue truck and quick response vehicle for medical emergencies.

In documents from February 2013 first made public on August 29, 2015, it was revealed that in August 2010, the FBI had sent a memo to its field offices in Nevada stating that it would patrol Burning Man to "aid in the prevention of terrorist activities and intelligence collection". Although a threat assessment performed by the FBI determined that drug usage and crowd control were the only major threats to Burning Man, the Bureau still sent an unspecified number of undercover officers to the event, with "no adverse threats or reactions".

Black Rock City design evolution

1986–1991 
From the very beginning on Baker Beach, to 1991 when Burning Man was set into its desert home, there was no real organizational structure to the city. According to Rod Garret, designer of Black Rock City, "The original form of the camp was a circle. This was not particularly planned, but formed instinctively from the traditional campfire circle and the urge to 'circle the wagons' against the nearly boundless space." This would not work for much longer, as attendance was reaching into the hundreds, and such a large gathering would require some planning.

1992–1995 
The Bureau of Land Management took notice of the event, and required that plans be drawn up to maintain safety. They also required the Burn to be registered as an official event. In response, four cardinal roads were added emanating from center camp. The center circle from the birth of the event was maintained.

In 1993, the first sound camp was opened. It was known as the Techno Ghetto, and it was located two miles north of Center Camp. It was not a usual theme camp, but was instead a mini hub on its own. There was a small "center camp" with a message board and Port-a-potties. Six massive sound systems faced out from the circle. The Techno Ghetto was placed separately to keep the 'rave' out of the main event, yet as time has progressed, music has become more and more closely tied into the core culture of Burning Man, even spawning a unique genre known as Playa Tech.

1996 
With the population growing to 8,000 in 1996, more structure was essential to both appease the Bureau of Land Management and to maintain safety. A ring around Center Camp, aptly named Ring Road, was added to provide for a second circle of theme camps. In addition, the eastern section of the circle around Center Camp in a cone shape was declared a "No Man's Land", devoid of all art installations and campsites. The goal was to provide a picturesque view from Center Camp of the Man in the distance. In addition to the camps circling the center, there were also camps lining the outside of the No Man's Land cone.

The techno ghetto would remain for one last year in 1996, and it wouldn't return. Regardless, the spark of music had ignited, and many other sound camps would follow.

1997 
In 1997 Burning Man was relocated. The event moved off of the Playa to the Hualapai Flat, due to political problems with Washoe County. Black Rock City truly became a city in 1997, with formal, labeled streets, zoning, and registration for vehicles and theme camps. Rod Garret was brought on board as the lead designer of Black Rock City from then on. In his design, Center Camp remained the starting point, with two angular arms reaching out on either side to form a shallow "V" shape around the Man. These main arms consisted of six annular roads, and two outlying plazas. 1997 is the first year of a Ranger-patrolled perimeter, and also the first year of one entry gate.

1998 
Burning Man returned to the playa in 1998, and the basis of the modern layout was implemented. The idea was to "recreate some of the intimacy of our original camping circle, but on a much larger civic scale". Rod Garret's design smoothed out the angular "V" from 1997 and implemented the arc, although in 1998, it stretched less than half-way around the circle. The radial streets were numbered North 1–20 and South 1–20, instead of the modern clock face system of names such as 11:30 or 5:15. There were four large plazas, each occupied by a major theme camp.

1999–2010 
In 1999, for the Wheel of Time theme, the great arc of the city was expanded to the full 240° ( of a circle) that it is today. The streets were re-numbered to correspond to a clock face, with the Man in the center, Center Camp at 6:00, and streets every 30 minutes (15°) 2:00 through 10:00.

2000 saw the introduction of the Temple as a fixture on the playa, and it has grown to be easily as important as the Man. It was placed at 12:00 out in the deep playa in the open third of the circle. 2000 also marked the year that the concept of a loud side and a quiet side was replaced by the rule that large scale sound camps would be placed at the 10:00 and 2:00 edges, facing out into the deep playa.

Extra annular streets have been added as need has increased.

2011–present 
In 2011, extra radial streets were added, from G street out, to make outer-city navigation easier. These streets were added at intervals of fifteen minutes.

Transportation

Road access
Highway 34 provides access to the main entrance to Black Rock City. The highway connects to Highway 447 north of Gerlach, which then runs south to Highway 427 in Wadsworth near Interstate 80.

Vehicles then proceed from the Highway 34 entrance north to the main gate via Gate Road, a desert dirt road with a speed limit of 10 mph. All vehicles driving into the city must have the appropriate vehicle pass, and all occupants are required to have valid tickets in order to get in. Vehicles are also searched for any items that are prohibited in the city. For those who have their tickets held at Will Call, the booths are located between the Highway 34 entrance and the main gate. All tickets and vehicle passes must be bought in advance; they are not directly sold outside the gate or at the Will Call booths. Furthermore, unless they have a valid early arrival pass for the pre-event set up, any vehicle who arrives before the gate opens is turned away and told to go back to Reno, and not to wait along the side of the road on either Highways 34 or 447 (which would be a safety hazard), nor stay in Gerlach (and overcrowd the small town).

 
When the Burning Man ends, and the mass exodus from Black Rock City begins, a road traffic control procedure called "Pulsing" is used to direct vehicles out of the city. At regular intervals (usually an hour during the peak periods), all vehicles are "pulsed" forward all at once for about a mile along Gate Road. This allows vehicles to stop and turn off their engines, while those at the southernmost mile of the multi-lane Gate Road slowly merge and then turn onto the two-lane Highway 34.

Commercial airports
The airport with regular commercial service closest to the event is the Reno–Tahoe International Airport in Reno, Nevada, over two hours' drive away. According to an airport spokesperson, in 2018 an estimated 18,000 burners arrived and departed through Reno's airport for the event, thereby giving the airport an $11 million boost. Inside the airport that year, a Burning Man-specific information table was created and placed near the baggage claim area.

San Francisco International Airport, nearly six hours away by car, is the nearest airport with a high volume of international service. Other prominent airports, albeit with less international passenger traffic and more domestic services, are Sacramento International Airport, which is a 4.5 hour drive from Black Rock City, as well as other Bay Area airports such as Oakland International Airport and San Jose International Airport.

Salt Lake City International Airport, serving Salt Lake City, Utah, and McCarran International Airport, serving Las Vegas, Nevada, are both a respective 8.5 hour drive to Black Rock City.

Temporary airport
A section of the Playa is used for a temporary airport, which is set up before each event and completely erased afterward. It serves both general aviation and charter flights. Pilots began camping there about 1995.  Once compelled to add structure, in 1999, it was established in a form acceptable to the BLM through the efforts of Tiger Tiger (Lissa Shoun) and LLC board member Mr. Klean (Will Roger). In 2009, it was recognized by the FAA as a private airport and designated 88NV. It is found on the Klamath Falls Sectional, using a CTAF of 122.9 MHz. Black Rock UNICOM and the airport are operational on that frequency from 6:00 am to 7:30 pm PDT each day during the event. The runway is simply a compacted strip of playa, and is not lighted. Because of the unique air traffic and safety issues associated with the airport, pilots are strongly encouraged to familiarize themselves with published information and procedures provided by, for example, AOPA. Because of the changes in the surface of the playa each year, information about the airport is subject to change.

Shuttles
There are prepaid shuttles, originating in Reno and San Francisco, that move participants to and from the event. During the event there was also a paid shuttle between the event and the nearby towns of Gerlach and Empire, but this has been discontinued. Exiting and reentering the event requires an additional fee, and is highly discouraged.

Other
Participants also share rides and hitchhike, although walking or bicycling into the event is not allowed.

"Leave No Trace" policy

Burning Man takes place in the middle of a large playa, and while not inhabited by humans itself, the area around the playa is home to many animals and plants. Supporters of Burning Man point out that participants are encouraged to leave no trace (LNT) of their visit to Black Rock City (BRC) and not to contaminate the area with litter, commonly known as MOOP (Matter Out of Place). Despite the BLM and LLC's insistence on the practice of LNT, the amount of residual trash at the site has increased over the years,

[t]he number of items per plot in the City consistently increased over the 2006 to 2009 ... Although the observed trend was not statistically significant, regression analysis indicated that the predicted trend explained over 97% of the variance in the data.

While fire is a primary component of many art exhibits and events, materials must be burned on a burn platform. From 1990 through 1999, burning was allowed to take place directly on the surface of the playa, but this left burn scars (fired pinkish clay-like playa surface). When it was finally determined that they did not dissipate with the annual winter rains and flooding, in 2000, the organization declared that fires had to be elevated from the playa surface for its protection. When it was discovered by two of the founders of the Friends of Black Rock / High Rock (Garth Elliott and Sue Weeks) and BLM Winnemucca district director Terry Reid that burn scars from prior sites (numbering 250) still remained, they were finally eradicated in 2000 by the DPW clean up crew headed by Dan Miller.

On the last day of the event, public shared burn areas are prepared for participants to use. It is an ongoing educational process each year to inform the public not to burn toxic materials for the protection of the environment and participants.

Even gray water is not to be dumped on the playa, and used shower water must be captured and either evaporated off, or collected and carried home with participants or disposed of by roving septic-pumping trucks, which also service RVs. Methods used for evaporating water often include a plastic sheet with a wood frame.

The Bureau of Land Management, which maintains the desert, has very strict requirements for the event. These stipulations include trash cleanup, removal of burn scars, dust abatement, and capture of fluid drippings from participant vehicles. For four weeks after the event has ended, the Black Rock City Department of Public Works (BRC – DPW) Playa Restoration Crew remains in the desert, cleaning up after the temporary city in an effort to make sure that no evidence of the event remains.

Criticism

Negative effects on the environment

Burning Man's carbon footprint is primarily from transportation to the remote area. The CoolingMan organization has estimated that the 2006 Burning Man was responsible for the generation of 27,000 tons of carbon dioxide, with 87% being from transportation to and from the remote location. The Sierra Club has criticized Burning Man for the "hundreds of thousands" of plastic water bottles that end up in landfills, as well as ostentatious displays of flames and explosions.

Burning Man's 2007 theme, "Green Man," received criticism for the artwork Crude Awakening, a 99-foot oil derrick that consumed 900 gallons of jet fuel and 2,000 gallons of liquid propane to blast a mushroom cloud 300 feet high into the sky.

In an attempt to offset some of the event's carbon footprint, 30- and 50-kilowatt solar arrays were constructed in 2007 as permanent artifacts, providing an estimated annual carbon offset of 559 tons. The Burn Clean Project is a volunteer organization that has helped replace the use of fossil fuel with biodiesel.

Gentrification
Burning Man has attracted a number of billionaires and celebrities, many of them from Silicon Valley and Hollywood. It has become a networking event for them, with Tesla Motors CEO Elon Musk once stating that Burning Man "is Silicon Valley."

These billionaires have paid for more luxurious camps to be set up in recent years. Derisively nicknamed "plug-n-play" or "turnkey" camps, they in general consist of lavish RVs and luxury restroom trailers that are driven into the city and connected together to form de facto gated areas. These billionaires then fly in to the airport on private planes, are driven to their camps, served by hired help (nicknamed "sherpas"), and sleep in air-conditioned beds. One venture capitalist billionaire threw a $16,500-per-head party at his camp. In 2017, Google employees shipped in a box of lobsters for a meal.

Despite allowing the rich to participate in Burning Man per the "radical inclusion" principle, many traditional attendees have spoken out against their exclusive practices. Larry Harvey wrote that they also conflict with the "radical self-reliance" and other principles, but has also stated that permitting the wealthy to attend is still beneficial for Burning Man. Vandalism that occurred at the White Ocean sound camp in 2016 was said to have been a "revolution" against these attendees, describing them as being a "parasite class" or "rich parasites".

Meanwhile, the regular admission price has increased over the years. In addition, Nevada lawmakers have modified the state's entertainment and sales tax code to include such nonprofit organizations like Burning Man that sell more than 15,000 tickets. As a result, an individual ticket (including taxes) cost $424 in 2016. Even tickets sold under Burning Man's low income program are subject to these taxes. Including transportation, food, camp fees, clothing and costumes, and gifts, CNBC estimated in 2016 that the total cost of attending could range from $1,300 up to $20,000. In 2017, Money magazine estimated an average total cost of $2,348 to attend.

According to the racial makeup of Burning Man attendees in 2014, 87% of them identified themselves as white, 6% as Hispanic / Latino, 6% as Asian, 2% as Native American, and 1% as black (figures rounded). When interviewed by The Guardian about these figures, Harvey replied, "I don't think black folks like to camp as much as white folks... . We're not going to set racial quotas.... This has never been, imagined by us, as a utopian society."

While there has been criticism that Burning Man has "jumped the shark," this proposition was criticized by cultural anthropologist Graham St John, who said that Burning Man was never a utopia in the first place.

Photography restrictions

The terms of the Burning Man ticket require that participants wishing to use photo and video-recording equipment share a joint copyright of their images of Black Rock City with Burning Man, and forbid them from using their images for commercial purposes. This has been criticized by many, including the Electronic Frontier Foundation (EFF). The amount of casual nudity at the event has significantly decreased over the years, due to the rise of ubiquitous cell phone cameras and the ability to easily upload photos to the Internet.

A Burning Man spokeswoman replied that the policies are not new, were written by a former head of the EFF, were used when suing to block pornographic videos, and ultimately arose from participant concerns, "We're proud that Black Rock City (a private event held on public land) is widely acknowledged as a bastion of creative freedom. [B]ut that protection [of participants' freedoms] does necessitate the acceptance of some general terms of engagement when it comes to cameras.... EFF seems to think that anyone attending any event somehow has an absolute right to take photographs, and then to do whatever they want with those images without any effective restriction or manner of enforcement. While we believe that such rights do make sense for any of us taking pictures in purely public spaces, this is not true in the private space of Burning Man – if it were, it would mean that Burning Man couldn't protect participant privacy or prevent commercialization of imagery."

The Burning Man organization has since worked with the EFF and with Creative Commons and other parties, and has revised and clarified the photography policies.

Regional events

The popularity of Burning Man has encouraged other groups and organizations to hold events similar to Burning Man, some of which serve as an epilogue for participants.

Burners have created smaller regional events modeled on Burning Man, such as Burning Flipside in Texas; Apogaea in Colorado; Playa del Fuego in Delaware; Firefly in New England; Kiwiburn in New Zealand; Blazing Swan in Australia; Transformus in West Virginia; AfrikaBurn in South Africa; NoWhere near Zaragoza in Spain; Midburn in Israel; and many others.

Some of the events are officially affiliated with the Burning Man organization via the Burning Man Regional Network. This official affiliation usually requires the event to conform to the 10 principles and certain standards outlined by the Burning Man organization and to be accompanied by a "Burning Man Regional Contact," a volunteer with an official relationship to the Burning Man Project via a legal Letter of Agreement. In exchange for conforming to these standards, the event is granted permission to officially communicate itself as a Burning Man Regional Event. Also, the regional event organizers are enabled to exchange best practices with each other on a global level via online platforms and in-person conferences, which are partly sponsored by the Burning Man Project.

In popular culture
 The Man Burns Tonight: A Black Rock City Mystery, a 2005 novel by Donn Cortez [Don DeBrandt], is set at Burning Man 2003.
 The 2010 South Park episode "Coon vs. Coon and Friends" features Cartman manipulating the Dark Lord Cthulhu to do his bidding, which includes destroying Burning Man.
 Cory Doctorow's 2013 novel Homeland opens at a near-future Burning Man.
 The 2016 video game Watch Dogs 2 features the characters visiting a Burning Man-themed event.
 The Simpsons 2014 episode "Blazed and Confused" features "Blazing Guy", an event based on Burning Man, with one character even referencing "Burning Man" before correcting herself to "Blazing Guy".
 The first Google Doodle, a playful adaptation of the Google logo, announced the founders' attendance at Burning Man in 1998.
 The plot of the 2005 Malcolm in the Middle episode "Burning Man" takes place during the event.
 The 2007 Xavier: Renegade Angel episode "Escape from Squatopian Freedom" features protagonist Xavier going to an event known as "Burning Person".
 The 2020 song "Burningman" by Jeff Wittek, Simon Rex and Jonah.
 The festival is one of the major settings of the 2011 French-language novel Tuer le père (literally: Killing the Father) by Belgian writer Amélie Nothomb.
 The ninth and final novel of Armistead Maupin's Tales of the City series ends with many of the characters from the saga assembling at Burning Man.

Films

 Dust & Illusions, a 2009 documentary about 30 years of Burning Man history from the perspective of 20 interviewees.
 Taking My Parents to Burning Man, a 2014 film documenting the adventures and misadventures as Bryant Boesen takes his parents on their first Burn.
 Spark: A Burning Man Story, a 2013 documentary about Burning Man, which includes behind-the-scenes footage and interviews with the founders.

See also

Festival gatherings
 Böögg
 Holika Dahan
 Lohri
 Rainbow Gathering
 Robodonien
 Rubber Tramp Rendezvous
 Saint John's Eve
 Vijayadashami
 Zozobra

Music festivals
 Boom Festival
 Boomtown
 Creamfields
 Fusion Festival
 Glastonbury Festival
 Mysteryland
 Ozora Festival
 Psy-Fi
 Tomorrowland (festival)
 Transformational festival

Yoga festivals
 Bhakti Fest
 Wanderlust Festival

Places
 Arcosanti
 Auroville
 Temporary Autonomous Zone

Others
 Wicker man
 Folk festivals in the United States
 Hexayurt

References

Further reading
 Bőnner, Bertine 2005. Das Burning Man Projekt – Religiosität und Spiritualität in Black Rock City? Eine ethnologische Perspektive. Magisterarbeit. Grin Verlag
 Bowditch, Rachel. 2010. On the edge of utopia: Performance and ritual at Burning Man. Seagull books.
 Chen, Katherine K. 2009. "Authenticity at Burning Man." Contexts 8(3): 65–67.
 
 Chen, Katherine K. 2012. "Artistic Prosumption: Cocreative Destruction at Burning Man." American Behavioral Scientist 56(4): 570–595.
 Cortez, Donn 2005. The Man Burns Tonight: A Black Rock City Mystery.
 Doherty, Brian. 2004. This is Burning Man. The Rise of a New American Underground. Boston/New York: Little, Brown and Company.
 Diehl, Ronny. 2010. The American Frontier in Acoustic Space. MA Thesis. Humboldt-University of Berlin. Grin Verlag.
 Gauthier, François. 2013. "The Enchantments of Consumer Capitalism: Beyond Belief at the Burning Man Festival" in Religion in Consumer Society, ed. François Gauthier. Ashgate, 143–158.
 Gilmore, Lee and Mark Van Proyen, eds. 2005. AfterBurn: Reflections on Burning Man. New Mexico: University of New Mexico Press.
 Hockett, Jeremy 2004. Reckoning Ritual and Counterculture in the Burning Man Community: Communication, Ethnography, and the Self in Reflexive Modernism. Dissertation. Albuquerque, New Mexico: The University of New Mexico.
 Kreuter, Holly. 2002. Drama in the Desert: The Sights and Sounds of Burning Man. San Francisco: Raised Barn Press.
 Kristen, Christine. "Reconnecting art and life at Burning Man" in: Raw Vision, Nr. 57 (Winter 2006), S. 28–35.
 Morehead, John W. 2007. Burning Man Festival as Life-Enhancing, Post-Christendom 'Middle Way'. MA Thesis. Salt Lake City, Utah: Salt Lake Theological Seminary.
 Nash, A. Leo. 2007. Burning Man: Art in the Desert, Introduction by Daniel Pinchbeck. New York: Harry N. Abrams.
 Pike, Sarah M. 2001. Desert Goddesses and Apocalyptic Art. Making Sacred Space at the Burning Man Festival. In: Mazur, Eric Michael/McCarthy, Kate (Hrsg.): God in the Details. American Religion in Popular Culture. London/New York: Routledge, 155–176.
 Post, George P. 2012. Dancing with the Playa Messiah: A 21-Year Burning Man Photo Album. Richmond, CA: Dragon Fotografix.
 Roberts, Adrian, ed. "Burning Man Live: 13 years of Piss Clear, Black Rock City's alternative newspaper" San Francisco: RE/Search Publications.
 St John, Graham. 2017. Blazing Grace: The Gifted Culture of Burning ManNANO: New American Notes Online, 11.
 St John, Graham. 2018. The Big Empty Aeon, 10 September.
 White, Carolyn L. 2020. The Archaeology of Burning Man: The Rise and Fall of Black Rock City. University of New Mexico Press. online review

External links

 
 Burning Man page Annual coverage from SFGate.com and the San Francisco Chronicle
 
 FBI file on Burning Man

 
1986 establishments in California
1986 in San Francisco
Articles containing video clips
Black Rock Desert
Cacophony Society
Counterculture festivals
Culture of San Francisco
Festivals in Nevada
Intentional communities in the United States
New Age in popular culture
Recurring events established in 1986
Rituals
Traditions involving fire
Transformational festivals